The Ernst Thalmann Company  was a company within Yugoslav Partisans composed of ethnic Germans from Slavonia (then Independent State of Croatia, modern day Croatia). It belonged to the Podravina Detachment of Sixth Slavonian Corp of Yugoslav Partisans. The company was established on 15 August 1943 in Slatinski Drenovac, from the order of the Sixth Slavonian Corp and composed of 10 Germans, 5 of them being members of the Communist Party for many years. Its first commander was Rudolph Vanpotić. Initially it was composed of 40 soldiers, mostly of German ethnicity and a number of Serbs and Croats. The Ernst Thalmann Company was disestablished in Summer of 1944. This company was named after Ernst Thälmann, the leader of the Communist Party of Germany (KPD) during much of the Weimar Republic.

The intention of Partisan command was to mobilize as many young Germans as possible, to prevent their participation in Waffen-SS units and German police. The members of the company included several women of German ethnicity. The commanders of Telman Company were Germans who issued orders on German language hoisting national flag of German minority in Yugoslavia. The company was reinforced with squad of heavy machineguns.

References

Sources

Further reading 
 S. Hrečkovski, Njemačka četa Ernst Thalmann u jedinicama NOV i POJ u Slavoniji, Glas Slavonije od 15. VIII 1968
 Redžić, Nail: Telmanovci: zapisi onjemačkoj partizanskojčeti"Ernst Telman“. (Telmanovci: Notizen über die deutsche Partisanentruppe „Ernst Thälmann“). Beograd 1984.
 Die »Telmanovci« fochten unter Schwarz-Rot gold, Neus Deutschland, 30. XI 1965
 Swartz-Rot Gold and der Titovka, Wochen post, 4 XII 1965
 Požar, Petar - Njemci u partizanima, Fokus 5/1980

Military units and formations of the Yugoslav Partisans